Priest Drive/Washington (also known as Papago Park Center) is a light rail station on Valley Metro Rail in Tempe, Arizona, United States. It is the tenth stop westbound and the nineteenth stop eastbound on the initial  starter line. Eastbound trains start their service from this station in morning.

Ridership

Notable places nearby
 Papago Park
 Phoenix Zoo
 Desert Botanical Garden
 Phoenix Municipal Stadium

References

External links
 Valley Metro map

Valley Metro Rail stations
Railway stations in the United States opened in 2008
2008 establishments in Arizona
Buildings and structures in Tempe, Arizona